Rhobonda is a genus of moths in the family Choreutidae.

Species
Rhobonda gaurisana Walker, 1863
Rhobonda heliaspis (Meyrick, 1926)
Rhobonda palaeocosma (Meyrick, 1926)

External links
choreutidae.lifedesks.org

Choreutidae